The following is a partial list of Canadian football stadiums, ordered by permanent capacity. Most of Canada's football stadiums with permanent seating capacities over 3,000 are listed here. Note that not all stadiums are exclusively used for Canadian football; several are also used for association football (soccer).

Current

Over 10,000

Under 10,000

See also
Rogers Centre, Toronto.  Formerly a major venue for Canadian football, baseball-only configuration since 2016
List of Canadian Football League stadiums
List of North American stadiums by capacity

References 

Football, capacity
 
Lists of stadiums
Lists of sports venues with capacity